Maroons are descendants of Africans in the Americas and Islands of the Indian Ocean who escaped from slavery and formed their own settlements. They often mixed with indigenous peoples, eventually evolving into separate creole cultures such as the Garifuna and the Mascogos.

Etymology 

Maroon, which can have a more general sense of being abandoned without resources, entered English around the 1590s, from the French adjective , meaning 'feral' or 'fugitive'. (Despite the same spelling, the meaning of 'reddish brown' for maroon did not appear until the late 1700s, perhaps influenced by the idea of maroon peoples.)

The American Spanish word  is also often given as the source of the English word maroon, used to describe the runaway slave communities in Florida, in the Great Dismal Swamp on the border of Virginia and North Carolina, on colonial islands of the Caribbean, and in other parts of the New World. Linguist Lyle Campbell says the Spanish word  means 'wild, unruly' or 'runaway slave'. The linguist Leo Spitzer, writing in the journal Language, says, "If there is a connection between Eng. maroon, Fr. , and Sp. , Spain (or Spanish America) probably gave the word directly to England (or English America)."

Alternatively, the Cuban philologist José Juan Arrom has traced the origins of the word maroon further than the Spanish cimarrón, used first in Hispaniola to refer to feral cattle, then to Indian slaves who escaped to the hills, and by the early 1530s to African slaves who did the same. He proposes that the American Spanish word derives ultimately from the Arawakan root word , construed as 'fugitive', in the Arawakan language spoken by the Taíno people native to the island.

History 

In the New World, as early as 1512, African slaves escaped from Spanish captors and either joined indigenous peoples or eked out a living on their own. The first slave rebellion occurred in present day Dominican Republic on the sugar plantations owned by Admiral Diego Columbus, on 26 December 1522, and was brutally crushed by the Admiral. The first maroon communities of the Americas were established following this revolt, as many of the slaves were able to escape. This would also give rise to a wave of Dominican maroons who would go on to lead the first maroon activities of the Americas. Sebastián Lemba, born in Africa, successfully rebelled against the Spaniards in 1532, and banded together with other Africans in his 15-year struggle against the Spanish colonists. Lemba would eventually be joined by other maroons such as Juan Vaquero, Diego del Guzmán, Fernando Montoro, Juan Criollo and Diego del Campo in the struggle against slavery. As the maroons threatened Spanish commerce and trade, Spanish officials began to fear a maroon takeover of the island. By the 1540s, maroons had already controlled the interior portions of the island, although areas in the east, north, and western parts of the island would also fall under maroon control. Maroon bands would venture out throughout the island, usually in large groups, attack villages they encounter, burn down plantations, kill and ransack from Spaniards, and liberate the slaves. Roadways had become so open to attack, the Spaniards felt it was necessary to only navigate in groups. Dominican maroons would be present throughout the island until the mid 17th century.

Sir Francis Drake enlisted several cimarrones during his raids on the Spanish. As early as 1655, escaped Africans had formed communities in inland Jamaica, and by the 18th century, Nanny Town and other Jamaican maroon villages began to fight for independent recognition.

When runaway slaves and Amerindians banded together and subsisted independently they were called "maroons". On the Caribbean islands, they formed bands and on some islands, armed camps. Maroon communities faced great odds against their surviving attacks by hostile colonists, obtaining food for subsistence living, as well as reproducing and increasing their numbers. As the planters took over more land for crops, the maroons began to lose ground on the small islands. Only on some of the larger islands were organised maroon communities able to thrive by growing crops and hunting. Here they grew in number as more slaves escaped from plantations and joined their bands. Seeking to separate themselves from colonisers, the maroons gained in power and amid increasing hostilities. They raided and pillaged plantations and harassed planters until the planters began to fear a massive revolt of the black slaves.

The early maroon communities were usually displaced. By 1700, maroons had disappeared from the smaller islands. Survival was always difficult, as the maroons had to fight off attackers as well as grow food. One of the most influential maroons was François Mackandal, a houngan or voodoo priest, who led a six-year rebellion against the white plantation owners in Haiti that preceded the Haitian Revolution.

In Cuba, there were maroon communities in the mountains, where African refugees had escaped the brutality of slavery and joined Taínos. Before roads were built into the mountains of Puerto Rico, heavy brush kept many escaped maroons hidden in the southwestern hills where many also intermarried with the natives. Escaped slaves sought refuge away from the coastal plantations of Ponce.<ref>{{cite journal|first=Franklin W.|last=Knight|url=https://www.jstor.org/stable/2515149 |title=Review of Benjamin Nistal-Moret, Esclavos prófugos y cimarrones: Puerto Rico, 1770–1870|journal=Hispanic American Historical Review|volume=66|issue=2|date=May 1986|pages=381–382|jstor=2515149 }}</ref> Remnants of these communities remain as of 2006, for example in Viñales, Cuba, and Adjuntas, Puerto Rico.

Maroon communities emerged in many places in the Caribbean (St Vincent and Dominica, for example), but none were seen as such a great threat to the British as the Jamaican Maroons. Beginning in the late 17th century, Jamaican Maroons consistently fought British colonists, leading to the First Maroon War (1728–1740). In 1739 and 1740, the British governor of the Colony of Jamaica, Edward Trelawny, signed treaties promising them  in two locations, at Cudjoe's Town (Trelawny Town) in western Jamaica and Crawford's Town in eastern Jamaica, to bring an end to the warfare between the communities. In exchange, they were to agree to capture other escaped slaves. They were initially paid a bounty of two dollars for each African returned. The treaties effectively freed the Maroons a century before the Slavery Abolition Act 1833, which came into effect in 1838. To this day, the Jamaican Maroons are to a significant extent autonomous and separate from Jamaican society. The physical isolation used to their advantage by their ancestors has today led to their communities remaining among the most inaccessible on the island. In their largest town, Accompong, in the parish of St Elizabeth, the Leeward Maroons still possess a vibrant community of about 600. Tours of the village are offered to foreigners and a large festival is put on every January 6 to commemorate the signing of the peace treaty with the British after the First Maroon War.

In the plantation colony of Suriname, which England ceded to the Netherlands in the Treaty of Breda (1667), escaped slaves revolted and started to build their villages from the end of the 17th century. As most of the plantations existed in the eastern part of the country, near the Commewijne River and Marowijne River, the Marronage took place along the river borders and sometimes across the borders of French Guiana. By 1740, the maroons had formed clans and felt strong enough to challenge the Dutch colonists, forcing them to sign peace treaties. On October 10, 1760, the Ndyuka signed such a treaty, drafted by Adyáko Benti Basiton of Boston, a formerly enslaved African from Jamaica who had learned to read and write and knew about the Jamaican treaty. The treaty is still important, as it defines the territorial rights of the Maroons in the gold-rich inlands of Suriname.

 Culture 

Slaves escaped frequently within the first generation of their arrival from Africa and often preserved their African languages and much of their culture and religion. African traditions included such things as the use of certain medicinal herbs together with special drums and dances when the herbs are administered to a sick person. Other African healing traditions and rites have survived through the centuries.

The jungles around the Caribbean Sea offered food, shelter, and isolation for the escaped slaves. Maroons sustained themselves by growing vegetables and hunting. Their survival depended upon their cultures, and their military abilities, using guerrilla tactics and heavily fortified dwellings involving traps and diversions. Some defined leaving the community as desertion and therefore punishable by death. They also originally raided plantations. During these attacks, the maroons would burn crops, steal livestock and tools, kill slavemasters, and invite other slaves to join their communities. Individual groups of maroons often allied themselves with the local indigenous tribes and occasionally assimilated into these populations. Maroons played an important role in the histories of Brazil, Suriname, Puerto Rico, Haiti, Dominican Republic, Cuba, and Jamaica.

There is much variety among maroon cultural groups because of differences in history, geography, African nationality, and the culture of indigenous people throughout the Western Hemisphere.

Maroon settlements often possessed a clannish, outsider identity. They sometimes developed Creole languages by mixing European tongues with their original African languages. One such maroon creole language, in Suriname, is Saramaccan. At other times, the maroons would adopt variations of a local European language (creolization) as a common tongue, for members of the community frequently spoke a variety of mother tongues.

The maroons created their own independent communities, which in some cases have survived for centuries, and until recently remained separate from mainstream society. In the 19th and 20th centuries, maroon communities began to disappear as forests were razed, although some countries, such as Guyana and Suriname, still have large maroon populations living in the forests. Recently, many of them moved to cities and towns as the process of urbanization accelerates.

 Types of maroons 

A typical maroon community in the early stage usually consists of three types of people.

 Most of them were slaves who ran away directly after they got off the ships. They refused to surrender their freedom and often tried to find ways to go back to Africa.
The second group were slaves who had been working on plantations for a while. Those slaves were usually somewhat adjusted to the slave system but had been abused by the plantation owners – often with excessive brutality. Others ran away when they were being sold suddenly to a new owner.
The last group of maroons were usually skilled slaves with particularly strong opposition to the slave system.

 Relationship with colonial governments 

Maroonage was a constant threat to New World plantation societies. Punishments for recaptured maroons were severe, like removing the Achilles tendon, amputating a leg, castration, and being roasted to death.

Maroon communities had to be inaccessible and were located in inhospitable environments to be sustainable. For example, maroon communities were established in remote swamps in the southern United States; in deep canyons with sinkholes but little water or fertile soil in Jamaica; and in deep jungles of the Guianas.

Maroon communities turned the severity of their environments to their advantage to hide and defend their communities. Disguised pathways, false trails, booby traps, underwater paths, quagmires and quicksand, and natural features were all used to conceal maroon villages.

Maroons utilised exemplary guerrilla warfare skills to fight their European enemies. Nanny, the famous Jamaican maroon, developed guerrilla warfare tactics that are still used today by many militaries around the world. European troops used strict and established strategies while maroons attacked and retracted quickly, used ambush tactics, and fought when and where they wanted to.

Even though colonial governments were in a perpetual state of hatred toward the maroon communities, individuals in the colonial system traded goods and services with them. Maroons also traded with isolated white settlers and Native American communities. Maroon communities played interest groups off of one another. At the same time, maroon communities were also used as pawns when colonial powers clashed.

Absolute secrecy and loyalty of members were crucial to the survival of maroon communities. To ensure this loyalty, maroon communities used severe methods to protect against desertion and spies. New members were brought to communities by way of detours so they could not find their way back and served probationary periods, often as slaves. Crimes such as desertion and adultery were punishable by death.

 Geographical distribution 

 Africa 

 Mauritius 

Under governor Adriaan van der Stel in 1642 the early Dutch settlers of the Dutch East India Company brought 105 slaves from Madagascar and parts of Asia to work for them in Dutch Mauritius. However 52 of these first slaves, including women, escaped in the wilderness of Dutch Mauritius. Only 18 of these escapees were caught. On 18 June 1695 a gang of maroons of Indonesian and Chinese origins, including Aaron d'Amboine, Antoni (Bamboes) and Paul de Batavia, as well as female escapees Anna du Bengale and Espérance, set fire to the Dutch settlers' Fort Frederick Hendryk (Vieux Grand Port) in an attempt to take over control of the island. They were all caught and decapitated. In February 1706 another revolt was organised by the remaining maroons as well as disgruntled slaves. When the Dutch abandoned Dutch Mauritius in 1710 the maroons stayed behind.

When representatives of the French East India Company landed on the island in 1715 they also had to face attacks by the Mauritian maroons. Significant events were the 1724 assault on a military outpost in Savannah district, as well as the attack on a military barrack in 1732 at Poste de Flacq. Several deaths resulted from such attacks. Soon after his arrival in 1735, Mahé de La Bourdonnais assembled and equipped French militia groups made of both civilians and soldiers to fight against the maroons. In 1739 maroon leader Sans Souci was captured near Flacq and was burnt alive by the French settlers. A few years later a group of French settlers gave chase to Barbe Blanche, another maroon leader, but lost track of him at Le Morne. Other maroons included Diamamouve and Madame Françoise.

 Réunion 

The most important maroons on Réunion were Cimendef, Cotte, Dimitile and Maffate.

 North America 

 Canada 

 Nova Scotia 

In the 1790s, about 600 Jamaican Maroons were deported to British settlements in Nova Scotia, where American slaves who had escaped from the United States were also resettled. Being unhappy with conditions, in 1800, a majority emigrated to what is now Sierra Leone in Africa.

 Caribbean 

 Cuba 

In Cuba, escaped slaves joined refugee Taínos in the mountains to form maroon communities.

In 1538, runaways helped the French to sack the city of Havana.

In 1731, slaves rose up in revolt at the Cobre mines, and set up an independent community at Sierra del Cobre, which existed untroubled until 1781, when the self-freed population had increased to over 1,000. In 1781, the Spanish colonial authorities agreed to recognise the freedom of the people of this community.

In 1797, one of the captured leaders of a palenque near Jaruco was an Indian from the Yucatán.

In the 1810s, Ventura Sanchez, also known as Coba, was in charge of a palenque of several hundred maroons in the mountains not far from Santiago de Cuba. Sanchez was tricked into going to Santiago de Cuba, where he committed suicide rather than be captured and returned to slavery. The leadership of the palenque then passed to Manuel Grinan, also known as Gallo.

The palenque of Bumba was so well organised that they even sent maroons in small boats to Jamaica and Santo Domingo to trade. In 1830, the Spanish colonial authorities carried out military expeditions against the palenques of Bumba and Maluala. Antonio de Leon eventually succeeded in destroying the palenque of Bumba.

In the 1830s, palenques of maroon communities thrived in western Cuba, in particular the areas surrounding San Diego de Nunez. The Office of the Capture of Maroons reported that between 1797 and 1846, there were thousands of runaways living in these palenques. However, the eastern mountains harboured the longer lasting palenques, in particular those of Moa and Maluala, where the maroons thrived until the First War of Independence in 1868, when large numbers of maroons joined the Cuban Liberation Army.

There are 28 identified archaeological sites in the Viñales Valley related to runaway African slaves or maroons of the early 19th century; the material evidence of their presence is found in caves of the region, where groups settled for various lengths of time. Oral tradition tells that maroons took refuge on the slopes of the mogotes and in the caves; the Viñales Municipal Museum has archaeological exhibits that depict the life of runaway slaves, as deduced through archeological research. Cultural traditions reenacted during the Semana de la Cultura (Week of Culture) celebrate the town's founding in 1607.

 Dominica, Saint Lucia, and Saint Vincent 

Similar maroon communities developed on islands across the Caribbean, such as those of the Garifuna people on Saint Vincent. Many of the Garifuna were deported to the American mainland, where some eventually settled along the Mosquito Coast or in Belize. From their original landing place in Roatan Island off the coast of Honduras, the maroons moved to Trujillo. Gradually groups migrated south into the Miskito Kingdom and north into Belize.

In Dominica, escaped slaves joined indigenous Kalinago in the island's densely forested interior to create maroon communities, which were constantly in conflict with the British colonial authorities throughout the period of formal chattel slavery.

In the French colony of Saint Lucia, maroons and fugitive French Revolutionary Army soldiers formed the so-called , which comprised about 6,000 men who fought the First Brigand War against the British who had recently occupied the island. Led by the French Commissioner, Gaspard Goyrand, they succeeded in taking back control of most of the island from the British, but on 26 May 1796, their forces defending the fort at Morne Fortune, about 2,000 men surrendered to a British division under the command of General John Moore. After the capitulation, over 2,500 French and Afro-Caribbean prisoners of war as well as ninety-nine women and children, were transported from St. Lucia to Portchester Castle. They were eventually sent to France in a prisoner exchange; some remained in Europe while others returned to France.

 Dominican Republic 

American marronage began in Spain's colony on the island of Hispaniola. Governor Nicolás de Ovando was already complaining of escaped slaves and their interactions with the Taíno Indians by 1503. The first slave rebellion occurred in Hispaniola on the sugar plantations owned by Admiral Diego Columbus, on 26 December 1522, and was brutally crushed by the Admiral.

Maroons joined the natives in their wars against the Spanish and hid with the rebel chieftain Enriquillo in the Bahoruco Mountains. When Archdeacon Alonso de Castro toured Hispaniola in 1542, he estimated the maroon population at 2,000–3,000 persons.

 Haiti 

The French encountered many forms of slave resistance during the 17th and 18th centuries, in Saint Domingue, which later came to be called Haiti. Formerly enslaved Africans who fled to remote mountainous areas were called marron (French) or mawon (Haitian Creole), meaning 'escaped slave'. The maroons formed close-knit communities that practised small-scale agriculture and hunting. They were known to return to plantations to free family members and friends. On a few occasions, they also joined the Taíno settlements, who had escaped the Spanish in the 17th century. In the late 17th and early 18th centuries, there were a large number of maroons living in the Bahoruco mountains. In 1702, a French expedition against them killed three maroons and captured 11, but over 30 evaded capture, and retreated further into the mountainous forests. Further expeditions were carried out against them with limited success, though they did succeed in capturing one of their leaders, Michel, in 1719. In subsequent expeditions, in 1728 and 1733, French forces captured 46 and 32 maroons respectively. No matter how many detachments were sent against these maroons, they continued to attract runaways. Expeditions in 1740, 1742, 1746, 1757 and 1761 had minor successes against these maroons, but failed to destroy their hideaways.

In 1776–1777, a joint French–Spanish expedition ventured into the border regions of the Bahoruco mountains, with the intention of destroying the maroon settlements there. However, the maroons had been alerted of their coming, and had abandoned their villages and caves, retreating further into the mountainous forests where they could not be found. The detachment eventually returned, unsuccessful and having lost many soldiers to illness and desertion. In the years that followed, the maroons attacked a number of settlements, including Fond-Parisien, for food, weapons, gunpowder and women. It was on one of these excursions that one of the maroon leaders, Kebinda, who had been born in freedom in the mountains, was captured. He later died in captivity.

In 1782, de Saint-Larry decided to offer peace terms to one of the maroon leaders, Santiago, granting them freedom in return for which they would hunt all further runaways and return them to their owners. Eventually, at the end of 1785, terms were agreed, and the more than 100 maroons under Santiago's command stopped making incursions into French colonial territory.

Other slave resistance efforts against the French plantation system were more direct. The maroon leader Mackandal led a movement to poison the drinking water of the plantation owners in the 1750s.

Boukman declared war on the French plantation owners in 1791, setting off the Haitian Revolution. A statue called the Le Nègre Marron or the Nèg Mawon is an iconic bronze bust that was erected in the heart of Port-au-Prince to commemorate the role of maroons in Haitian independence.

 Jamaica 

People who escaped from slavery during the Spanish occupation of the island of Jamaica fled to the interior and joined the Taíno living there, forming refugee communities. Later, many of them gained freedom during the confusion surrounding the 1655 English Invasion of Jamaica. Some refugee slaves continued to join them through the decades until the abolition of slavery in 1838, but in the main, after the signing of the treaties of 1739 and 1740, the Maroons hunted runaway slaves in return for payment from the British colonial authorities.

During the late 17th and 18th centuries, the British tried to capture the maroons because they occasionally raided plantations, and made expansion into the interior more difficult. An increase in armed confrontations over decades led to the First Maroon War in the 1730s, but the British were unable to defeat the maroons. They finally settled with the groups by treaty in 1739 and 1740, allowing them to have autonomy in their communities in exchange for agreeing to be called to military service with the colonists if needed. Certain maroon factions became so formidable that they made treaties with local colonial authorities, sometimes negotiating their independence in exchange for helping to hunt down other slaves who escaped.

Due to tensions and repeated conflicts with maroons from Trelawny Town, the Second Maroon War erupted in 1795. After the governor tricked the Trelawny Maroons into surrendering, the colonial government deported approximately 600 captive maroons to Nova Scotia. Due to their difficulties and those of Black Loyalists settled at Nova Scotia and England after the American Revolution, Great Britain established a colony in West Africa, Sierra Leone. It offered ethnic Africans a chance to set up their community there, beginning in 1792. Around 1800, several hundred Jamaican maroons were transported to Freetown, the first settlement of Sierra Leone. Eventually, in the 1840s, about 200 Trelawny Maroons returned to Jamaica, and settled in the village of Flagstaff in the parish of St James, not far from Trelawny Town, which is now named Maroon Town, Jamaica.

The only Leeward Maroon settlement that retained formal autonomy in Jamaica after the Second Maroon War was Accompong, in Saint Elizabeth Parish, whose people had abided by their 1739 treaty with the British. A Windward Maroon community is also located at Charles Town, Jamaica, on Buff Bay River in Portland Parish. Another is at Moore Town (formerly Nanny Town), also in the parish of Portland. In 2005, the music of the Moore Town Maroons was declared by UNESCO as a 'Masterpiece of the Oral and Intangible Heritage of Humanity.' A fourth community is at Scott's Hall, Jamaica, in the parish of St Mary. Accompong's autonomy was ratified by the government of Jamaica when the island gained independence in 1962.

The government has tried to encourage the survival of the other maroon settlements. The Jamaican government and the maroon communities organised the Annual International Maroon Conference, initially to be held at rotating communities around the island, but the conference has been held at Charles Town since 2009. Maroons from other Caribbean, Central, and South America nations are invited. In 2016, Accompong's colonel and a delegation traveled to the Kingdom of Ashanti in Ghana to renew ties with the Akan and Asante people of their ancestors.

 Puerto Rico 

In Puerto Rico, Taíno families from neighboring Utuado moved into the southwestern mountain ranges, along with escaped African slaves who intermarried with them. The DNA analysis of contemporary persons from this area shows maternal ancestry from the Mandinka, Wolof, and Fulani peoples through the mtDNA African haplotype associated with them yet also carried at low frequencies by Spaniards, L1b, which is present here. This was carried by African slaves who escaped from plantations around Ponce and formed communities with the Arawak (Taíno and Kalinago) in the mountains. Arawak lineages (Taíno people represented within haplogroups A and Kalinago people represented within haplogroups C) can also be found in this area.

 Central America 

 Belize, Guatemala, Honduras, and Nicaragua 

Several different maroon societies developed around the Gulf of Honduras. Some were found in the interior of modern-day Honduras, along the trade routes by which silver mined on the Pacific side of the isthmus was carried by slaves down to coastal towns such as Trujillo or Puerto Caballos to be shipped to Europe. When slaves escaped, they went to the mountains for safety. In 1548, in what is now Honduras, slaves in San Pedro rebelled, led by a self-freed slave named Miguel, who set up his own capital. The Spaniards had to send in reinforcements to put down the revolt.

In 1648, the English bishop of Guatemala, Thomas Gage, reported active bands of maroons numbering in the hundreds along these routes.

The Miskito Sambu were a maroon group who formed from slaves who revolted on a Portuguese ship around 1640, wrecking the vessel on the coast of Honduras-Nicaragua and escaping into the interior. They intermarried with the indigenous people over the next half-century. They eventually rose to leadership of the Mosquito Coast and led extensive slave raids against Spanish-held territories in the first half of the 18th century.

The Garifuna are descendants of maroon communities that developed on the island of Saint Vincent. They were deported to the coast of Honduras in 1797.

 Panama 

Bayano, a Mandinka man who had been enslaved and taken to Panama in 1552, led a rebellion that year against the Spanish in Panama. He and his followers escaped to found villages in the lowlands. Viceroy Canete felt unable to subdue these maroons, so he offered them terms that entailed a recognition of their freedom, provided they refused to admit any newcomers and returned runaways to their owners.

Later these people, known as the Cimarrón, assisted Sir Francis Drake in fighting against the Spanish.

 Mexico 

Gaspar Yanga was an African leader of a Maroon colony in the Veracruz highlands in what is now Mexico. It is believed Yanga had been a fugitive since the early 1570s, and was the leader of a formidable group of maroons.

In 1609, Captain Pedro Gonzalo de Herrera lad an expedition against Yanga and his maroons, but despite severe casualties on both sides, neither emerged the victor. Instead, Yanga negotiated with the Spanish colonists to establish a self-ruled maroon settlement called San Lorenzo de los Negros (later renamed Yanga). Yanga secured recognition of the freedom of his maroons, and his palenque was accorded the status of a free town. In return, Yanga was required to return any further runaways to the Spanish colonial authorities.

The Costa Chica of Guerrero and of Oaxaca include many hard-to-access areas that also provided refuge for slaves escaping Spanish ranches and estates on the Pacific coast. Evidence of these communities can be found in the Afro-Mexican population of the region. Other Afro-Mexican communities descended from people who escaped slavery are found in Veracruz and in Northern Mexico; some of the later communities were populated by people who escaped slavery in the United States via the Southern Underground Railroad.

 United States 

 Florida 

Maroons who escaped from the Thirteen Colonies and allied with Seminole Indians were one of the largest and most successful maroon communities in what is now Florida due to more rights and freedoms granted by the Spanish Empire. Some intermarried and were culturally Seminole; others maintained a more African culture. Descendants of those who were removed with the Seminole to Indian Territory in the 1830s are recognised as Black Seminoles. Many were formerly part of the Seminole Nation of Oklahoma, but have been excluded since the late 20th century by new membership rules that require proving Native American descent from historic documents.

 Illinois 

Lakeview was established as a Freedmen's town by a group of African-American runaway slaves and freedmen who immigrated from North Carolina shortly after the War of 1812. They arrived between 1818 and 1820. This area was ideal for the remaining Native Americans who lived, hunted, fished, and farmed this region and the black community integrated with the Amerindians.

 Louisiana 

Until the mid-1760s, maroon colonies lined the shores of Lake Borgne, just downriver of New Orleans, Louisiana. These escaped slaves controlled many of the canals and back-country passages from Lake Pontchartrain to the Gulf, including the Rigolets. The San Malo community was a long-thriving autonomous community. These colonies were eventually eradicated by militia from Spanish-controlled New Orleans led by Francisco Bouligny. Free people of color aided in their capture.

People who escaped enslavement in ante-bellum America continued to find refuge and freedom in rural Louisiana, including in areas around New Orleans.

 North Carolina and Virginia 

The Great Dismal Swamp maroons inhabited the marshlands of the Great Dismal Swamp in Virginia and North Carolina. Although conditions were harsh, research suggests that thousands lived there between about 1700 and the 1860s.

Robeson County, North Carolina was a place where Blacks, Native Americans, and even some outlaw whites lived together and intermingled producing a people of great genetic mixture.

 South America 

 Brazil 

One of the best-known quilombos (maroon settlements) in Brazil was Palmares (the Palm Nation), which was founded in the early 17th century. At its height, it had a population of over 30,000 free people and was ruled by King Zumbi. Palmares maintained its independent existence for almost a hundred years until it was conquered by the Portuguese in 1694.

Of the 10 major quilombos in colonial Brazil, seven were destroyed within two years of being formed. Four fell in the state of Bahia in 1632, 1636, 1646 and 1796. The other three met the same fate in Rio in 1650, Parahyba in 1731, and Piumhy in 1758.

One quilombo in Minas Gerais lasted from 1712–1719. Another, the "Carlota" of Mato Grosso, was wiped out after existing for 25 years, from 1770–1795.

There were also a number of smaller quilombos. The first reported quilombo was in 1575 in Bahia. Another quilombo in Bahia was reported at the start of the 17th century. Between 1737 and 1787, a small quilombo thrived in the vicinity of São Paulo.

The region of Campo Grande and São Francisco was often populated with quilombos. In 1741, Jean Ferreira organised an expedition against a quilombo, but many runaways escaped capture. In 1746, a subsequent expedition captured 120 members of the quilombo. In 1752, an expedition led by Pere Marcos was attacked by quilombo fighters, resulting in significant loss of life.Quilombos continued to form in the 19th century. In 1810, a quilombo was discovered at Linhares in the state of São Paulo. A decade later, another was found in Minas. In 1828, another quilombo was discovered at Cahuca, near Recife, and a year later an expedition was mounted against yet another at Corcovado, near Rio de Janeiro. In 1855, the Maravilha quilombo in Amazonas was destroyed.

The most famous quilombo was Palmares, an independent, self-sustaining community near Recife, established in about 1600. Part of the reason for the massive size of Palmares was due to its location in Brazil — at the median point between the Atlantic Ocean and Guinea, an important area of the African slave trade. Quilombo dos Palmares was a self-sustaining community of escaped slaves from the Portuguese settlements in Brazil, "a region perhaps the size of Portugal in the hinterland of Bahia". At its height, Palmares had a population of over 30,000.

In 1612, the Portuguese tried in vain to take Palmares in an expedition that proved to be very costly. In 1640, a Dutch scouting mission found that the self-freed community of Palmares was spread over two settlements, with about 6,000 living in one location and another 5,000 in another. Dutch expeditions against Palmares in the 1640s were similarly unsuccessful. Between 1672 and 1694, Palmares withstood, on average, one Portuguese expedition nearly every year.

Ganga Zumba and Zumbi are the two best-known warrior-leaders of Palmares which, after a history of conflict with first Dutch and then Portuguese colonial authorities, finally fell to a Portuguese artillery assault in 1694.

 Colombia 

In 1529, in what is now Colombia, rebel slaves destroyed Santa Marta.

Escaped slaves established independent communities along the remote Pacific coast, outside of the reach of the colonial administration. At the start of the seventeenth century, a group of runaways had established a palenque on the outskirts of the Magdalena River. Eventually, in 1654, the governor of Cartegena de Indias, Don Pedro Zapata, defeated and subdued this community of runaway maroons.

In what is now Colombia, in the district of Popayán, the palenque of Castillo was successfully established by runaway slaves. In 1732, the Spanish authorities tried to secure peace terms with the maroons of Castillo by inserting a clause requiring them to return runaways, but the rulers of Castillo rejected those terms. In 1745, the colonial authorities defeated Castillo, and over 200 African and Indian runaways surrendered.

The Caribbean coast still sees maroon communities like San Basilio de Palenque, where the creole Palenquero language is spoken. This community began at the start of the seventeenth century, when Benkos Biohó led a group of about 30 runaways into the forests, and defeated attempts to subdue them. Biohó declared himself King Benkos, and his palenque of San Basilio attracted large numbers of runaways to join his community. His maroons defeated the first expedition sent against them, killing their leader Juan Gomez. The Spanish arrived at terms with Biohó, but later they captured him in 1619, accused him of plotting against the Spanish, and had him hanged.

But runaways continued to escape to freedom in San Basilio. In 1696, the colonial authorities subdued another rebellion there, and again between 1713 and 1717. Eventually, the Spanish agreed to peace terms with the palenque of San Basilio, and in 1772, this community of maroons was included within the Mahates district, as long they no longer accepted any further runaways.

 Ecuador 

In addition to escaped slaves, survivors from shipwrecks formed independent communities along rivers of the northern coast and mingled with indigenous communities in areas beyond the reach of the colonial administration. Separate communities can be distinguished from the cantones Cojimies y Tababuela, Esmeraldas, Limones.

 The Guianas 

Marronage was common in British, Dutch, and French Guiana, and today descendants of maroons account for about 15% of the current population of Suriname and 22% in French Guiana. In the Guianas, escaped slaves, locally known as 'Bushinengues', fled to the interior and joined with indigenous peoples and created several independent tribes, among them the Saramaka, the Paramaka, the Ndyuka (Aukan), the Kwinti, the Aluku (Boni), and the Matawai.

The Ndyuka were the first to sign a peace treaty offering them territorial autonomy in 1760.

In the 1770s, the Aluku also desired a peace treaty, but the Society of Suriname started a war against them, resulting in a flight into French Guiana. The other tribes signed peace treaties with the Surinamese government, the Kwinti being the last in 1887. On 25 May 1891 the Aluku officially became French citizens.

After Suriname gained independence from the Netherlands, the old treaties with the Bushinengues were abrogated. By the 1980s the Bushinengues in Suriname had begun to fight for their land rights. Between 1986 and 1992, the Surinamese Interior War was waged by the Jungle Commando, a guerrilla group fighting for the rights of the maroon minority, against the military dictatorship of Dési Bouterse. In 2005, following a ruling by the Inter-American Court of Human Rights, the Suriname government agreed to compensate survivors of the 1986 Moiwana village massacre, in which soldiers had slaughtered 39 unarmed Ndyuka people, mainly women and children. On 13 June 2020, Ronnie Brunswijk was elected Vice President of Suriname by acclamation in an uncontested election. He was inaugurated on 16 July as the first Maroon in Suriname to serve as vice president.

In modern-day Guyana, Dutch officials in 1744 conducted an expedition against encampments of at least 300 Maroons in the Northwest district of Essequibo. The Dutch nailed severed hands of Maroons killed in the expedition to posts in the colony as a warning to other slaves. In 1782, a French official in the region estimated there were more than 2,000 Maroons in the vicinity of Berbice, Demerara, and Essequibo.

 Venezuela 

There were a number of rebellions of slaves throughout the history of the colony.

Through the region of Barlovento, many free and escaped slaves founded communities, known as cumbes. One of the most well-known of these settlements is Curiepe, where the annual Fiesta de San Juan is celebrated. Another was the cumbe of Ocoyta, led by runaway Guillermo Ribas, which reportedly engaged in a number of attacks on the neighbouring towns of Chuspa and Panaquire. These Venezuelan maroons also traded in cocoa. Guillermo ran away in 1768, and formed a cumbe which included runaways of African and Indian origin.

The cumbe of Ocoyta was eventually destroyed in 1771. A military expedition led by German de Aguilera destroyed the settlement, killing Guillermo, but only succeeded in capturing eight adults and two children. The rest of the runaways withdrew into the surrounding forests, where they remained at large.

One of Guillermo's deputies, Ubaldo the Englishman, whose christened name was Jose Eduardo de la Luz Perera, was initially born a slave in London, sold to a ship captain, and took a number of trips before eventually being granted his freedom. He was one of a number of free black people who joined the community of Ocoyta. In 1772, he was captured by the Spanish authorities.

There were many cumbes in the interior of what later became Venezuela. In 1810, when the War of Independence began, many members of these cumbes fought on the side of the rebels, and abandoned their villages.

 See also 

 Slave catcher
 Slave rebellion
 Afro-Latin American: Latin Americans of significant or mainly African ancestry.
 Black Seminoles: Indians associated with the Seminole people in Florida and Oklahoma.
 Bushinengues: in French Guiana, meaning people of the forest, descendants of slaves who escaped enslavement and established independent communities in the forest.
 Gaspar Yanga: an African known for being the leader of a maroon colony of slaves in New Spain.
 Saramaka: one of six Maroon peoples in the Republic of Suriname and one of the Maroon peoples in French Guiana.
 Jamaican Maroons: one of the few countries where Maroon communities still exist.
 Quilombo a 1985 film about Quilombo dos Palmares, a fugitive community of escaped slaves and others, in colonial Brazil.

 References 

 Sources 

 Literature 

History of the Maroons
 Russell Banks (1980), The Book of Jamaica.
 Campbell, Mavis Christine (1988), The Maroons of Jamaica, 1655–1796: a history of resistance, collaboration & betrayal, Granby, Mass.: Bergin & Garvey. 
 Corzo, Gabino La Rosa (2003), Runaway Slave Settlements in Cuba: Resistance and Repression (translated by Mary Todd), Chapel Hill: University of North Carolina Press. 
 Dallas, R. C. The History of the Maroons, from Their Origin to the Establishment of Their Chief Tribe at Sierra Leone. 2 vols. London: Longman. 1803.
 De Granada, Germán (1970), Cimarronismo, palenques y Hablas "Criollas" en Hispanoamérica Instituto Caro y Cuero, Santa Fe de Bogotá, Colombia, OCLC 37821053 (in Spanish)
 Diouf, Sylviane A. (2014), Slavery's Exiles: The Story of the American Maroons, New York: NYU Press, 
 Honychurch, Lennox (1995), The Dominica Story, London: Macmillan.  (Includes extensive chapters on the Maroons of Dominica)
 Hoogbergen, Wim S. M. Brill (1997), The Boni Maroon Wars in Suriname, Academic Publishers. 
 Learning, Hugo Prosper (1995), Hidden Americans: Maroons of Virginia and the Carolinas Garland Publishing, New York, 
 Price, Richard (ed.) (1973), Maroon Societies: rebel slave communities in the Americas, Garden City, N.Y.: Anchor Books. 
 Thompson, Alvin O. (2006), Flight to Freedom: African runaways and maroons in the Americas University of West Indies Press, Kingston, Jamaica, 

 van Velzen, H.U.E. Thoden and van Wetering, Wilhelmina (2004), In the Shadow of the Oracle: Religion as Politics in a Suriname Maroon Society'', Long Grove, Illinois: Waveland Press.

External links 

  (The Maroons, Hindustanis and others of Surinam.)
  A good short history of the "Bush Negroes" of Suriname.
 
  (A history of Jamaican Maroons.)
 
 
Black Prisoners of War at Porchester Castle
Lands of Freedom: the oral histories and cultural heritage of the Matawai Maroons in Suriname

 
People of African descent
Ethnic groups in the Caribbean 
Ethnic groups in Haiti
Ethnic groups in South America
Ethnic groups in Suriname
People of Saint-Domingue
People of the Colony of Santo Domingo
Pre-emancipation African-American history
Fugitive American slaves